Ferula is a genus of flowering plants.

Ferula may also refer to:

Papal ferula, the pastoral staff used in the Catholic Church by the Pope
 Férula, a character in The House of the Spirits by Isabel Allende
Ferula, leather-covered whale bone, used at St Ignatius' College for corporal punishment